The 2003–04 season was the 18th season in the existence of ES Troyes AC and the club's first season back in the second division of French football. In addition to the domestic league, ES Troyes AC participated in this season's editions of the Coupe de France and the Coupe de la Ligue.

Players

First-team squad

Transfers

In

Out

Pre-season and friendlies

Competitions

Overall record

Ligue 2

League table

Results summary

Results by round

Matches

Coupe de France

Coupe de la Ligue

References

ES Troyes AC seasons
Troyes